Neighborhoods in Cleveland refer to the 34 neighborhood communities of the city of Cleveland, Ohio, as defined by the Cleveland City Planning Commission. Based on historical definitions and census data, the neighborhoods serve as the basis for various urban planning initiatives on both the municipal and metropolitan levels. Technically known as Statistical Planning Areas (SPAs), they also provide a "framework for summarizing socio-economic and other statistics within the city." City neighborhood boundaries were last revised by the City Planning Commission in 2012.

Cleveland's neighborhoods are generally defined by their position on either the East Side or West Side of the Cuyahoga River. Downtown and Cuyahoga Valley are situated between the East and West Sides, while the Broadway–Slavic Village neighborhood is sometimes referred to as the South Side.

Neighborhoods

Notes

References

External links

Cleveland Neighborhoods, Destination Cleveland
Neighborhoods and Landmarks, The Encyclopedia of Cleveland History (Case Western Reserve University)
Current Cleveland Neighborhood Maps, Northern Ohio Data and Information Service (NODIS), Levin College of Urban Affairs (Cleveland State University)

 
Cleveland